Xi'an Aero-Engine Corporation (XAEC) is one of the major aircraft engine designers and manufacturers in China, originally established in 2001. It along with its parent company (via the Xihang Group), Xi'an Aircraft Industrial Corporation, is affiliated with the Aviation Industry Corporation of China (AVIC). XAEC is primarily located in the province of Shaanxi.

The company with 96,000 employees, is focused on designing, manufacturing and testing of aircraft engines. The Huarong Asset Management Corporation is/was also an equity partner in XAEC through the Xihang Group.

Products
WP-8
WS-9 - Chinese license production of  Rolls-Royce Spey 202
WS-15 to power J-20 stealth fighter.
WS-20 to power Y-20 heavy transport.

See also
China Beijing Equity Exchange

External links
Official Site 
GlobalSecurity.org entry on Xi'an Aero-Engine (Group) Co., Ltd. (XAE) Accessed 18 March 2015

Aircraft engine manufacturers of China
Manufacturing companies established in 2001
Gas turbine manufacturers
Companies based in Shaanxi